The 2023 Telangana legislative assembly election is scheduled to be held in or before December 2023 to elect all 119 members of the state's Legislative Assembly. K. Chandrashekar Rao of Bharat Rashtra Samithi, is expected to be the incumbent chief minister of state at the time of the elections.

Background
The tenure of Telangana Legislative Assembly is scheduled to end on 16 January 2024. The previous assembly elections were held in December 2018 and Bharat Rashtra Samithi formed the state government, with K. Chandrashekar Rao becoming the Chief Minister.

Schedule

Parties and alliances







On 17 February 2023, CPI state secretary Kunamneni Sambasiva Rao said that CPI(M) and CPI will contest together in the upcoming polls. He also added that the Left parties will ally with Bharat Rashtra Samithi only if they are given respectable number of seats. CPI(M) state secretary Tammineni Veerabhadram said that the Left parties decided to try to strike an alliance with BRS in pursuance of CPI(M) 23rd Party Congress's resolution to unite the anti-BJP forces. But there has been no negotiations regarding seat sharing formula. Although the Left parties, being the first political outfits in the state to announce electoral alliance for the polls, are leaning towards BRS to defeat BJP, they have not ruled out alliance with Congress if they do not get respectable share of seats from BRS.

Others

Candidates

Notes

References

T
State Assembly elections in Telangana
2023 State Assembly elections in India